Chicago-Read Mental Health Center (CRMHC, often called simply Read) is a state-run inpatient JCAHO-accredited facility with between 150 and 200 beds located in the neighborhood of Dunning on the northwest side of the city of Chicago close to O'Hare International Airport in the state of Illinois.  It has served the adult residents of Chicago under various names since 1854 as a repository for the mentally ill and destitute and as an alternative to incarceration for mentally ill offenders. Its former names have included the Chicago State Hospital and the Charles F. Read Zone Center; in 1885, it was called The County Insane Asylum and Infirmary. Originally, it was simply known as "Dunning" though "Dunning" officially closed on June 30, 1912, and reopened the next day as Chicago State Hospital. Much later, it became the Chicago-Read Mental Health Center.

Read has faced a number of setbacks in its time. In 1885, the Chicago Woman's Club and other organizations in Chicago called for an investigation into the hospital to correct the many problems found there. In 1901, it was found that nurses had starved two mental patients to death there; in 1988, the director of the facility was dismissed under what were described as deplorable conditions for patients; in 1992, it was under investigation for civil rights violations and in 1993, Read lost its accreditation altogether.

References

Hospitals in Chicago
Psychiatric hospitals in Illinois
North Side, Chicago
1854 establishments in Illinois
Hospitals established in 1854